"Caught in the Middle" is a song by British singer-songwriter Juliet Roberts, originally released in July 1993. In June 1994, it was re-released as a remix and became a club hit. It was well received among music critics, reaching number-one on both the US Billboard Hot Dance Club Play chart and the UK Dance Singles Chart (Music Week), where it peaked atop both in 1993 and 1994. Additionally, the song peaked at number 14 in the UK, and number 31 in Scotland, while on the Eurochart Hot 100, it reached number 43. It was co-written by Roberts and included on her debut album, Natural Thing (1994), and it won the Record Mirror Club Cut of the Year honour at the 1994 Music Week Awards. A music video was also produced to promote the single.

Critical reception

1993 version
Andy Beevers from Music Week rated "Caught in the Middle" four out of five, calling it a "superb single by one of the UK's foremost soul singers" that "is shaping up to be a big seller." In the magazine's RM Dance Update, he wrote, "This extremely special song, which was originally due out on Warners, finally sees the light of day a year later on Cooltempo. The title ended up being very prophetic for Juliet Roberts, and the 'How Long?' refrain was exactly the question being asked by the nation's DJs and punters. Now the track is here for all to enjoy in its Danny D-produced and Roger S-mixed glory. Sanchez's smooth but slamming remixes with their acapella and heartbeat breakdowns and dubwise outras are pure magic. What a voice! What a song!" It was also described as a "classy garage anthem". Another editor, James Hamilton, declared it as "gospelish garage".

1994 version
In 1994, Larry Flick from Billboard wrote, "Hot on the heels of the red-hot "I Want You" come fresh new David Morales remixes of a sparkling gem that has already stormed dancefloors throughout the U.K. and Europe. The power of the chorus is undeniably strong, and Roberts cuts loose a high-velocity performance that proves her star power. Once this one reaches the top of club charts (and you can bet top dollar that it will), watch this delightful single work every last programmer's nerve at top 40 radio. From the fab debut album Natural Thing." Pan-European magazine Music & Media commented, "Don't confuse this lady with the actress who recently married Lyle Lovett. This Roberts is caught in the act singing on Dina Carroll and Lisa Stansfield territory. Those nightingales should get worried, because the competition is getting tighter." 

Andy Beevers from Music Weeks RM Dance Update said, "When you've got to improve on near perfection, then there is only one person to call. Yep, that man Morales. He has taken this tune and created an epic remix that manages to surpass the ones which took it to the top of the 1993 end-of-year RM Club Chart. The classic Def Mix provides added bounce with its brash pianos. firing brass and wonderful techno-ish outro. It also boasts more serious breakdowns than an Allegro that's been round the clock a couple of times." He stated that "Caught in the Middle" "is poised to be an even bigger hit this time around." Neil Spencer from The Observer felt it "set her powerhouse vocals with equally muscular beats."

Track listings

 12-inch, UK (1993)"Caught in the Middle" (Gospel Revival Mix)
"Caught in the Middle" (Monster Club Mix)
"Caught in the Middle" (Heartbeat Mix)
"Caught in the Middle" (Fire Island Mix)

 CD single, UK (1993)"Caught in the Middle" (Gospel Revival Edit) – 3:31
"Caught in the Middle" (Hip Hop Edit) – 4:06
"Caught in the Middle" (Monster Club Mix) – 5:57
"Caught in the Middle" (Fire Island Mix) – 6:28
"Caught in the Middle" (Gospel Revival Mix) – 9:00
"Caught in the Middle" (Roach Motel Mix) – 8:04

 CD single (94' Remixes), UK (1994)"Caught in the Middle" (Def Classic Radio Mix) – 3:21
"Caught in the Middle" (Gospel Revival Edit) – 3:31
"Caught in the Middle" (Def Classic 12" Mix) – 8:54
"Stop for Love" – 4:11

 CD maxi, US (1994)'
"Caught in the Middle" (Album Edit) – 3:59
"Caught in the Middle" (Def Classic Radio) – 3:48
"Caught in the Middle" (Monster Club Mix) – 5:55
"Caught in the Middle" (Def Classic Mix) – 9:27
"Caught in the Middle" (Roger S. Gospel Revival Mix) – 5:48
"Caught in the Middle" (Oscar G. Radio Mix) – 5:09

Charts

Weekly charts

Year-end charts

Release history

References

1993 singles
1993 songs
1994 singles
Cooltempo Records singles
House music songs
Music Week number-one dance singles